Paul Hegarty (born 30 May 1967 in Raphoe, County Donegal, Ireland) is former Irish footballer and current assistant manager of League of Ireland Premier Division club Finn Harps. 'Heggsy' as he is commonly referred to has also previously managed nearby clubs Institute and Finn Harps as well as another brief period as assistant to Stephen Kenny at Derry from 2005 to 2006.

Playing career
He played youth football in the Ulster Senior League before signing with Derry City where he made his League of Ireland debut on 13 September 1987. He later moved to Finn Harps before returning to Derry to play once more with City and Coleraine F.C. He also had a spell at Institute as a player-manager. Hegarty was known throughout Ireland as one of the toughest tackling midfielders of his era.

Managerial and Coaching
Before becoming the assistant manager to Stephen Kenny at Derry City in 2005, Hegarty had a spell of management at Institute. His fiery temper and desire for his team to do well was evident during every game. This driven and determined attitude is reminiscent of the character Hegarty displayed on the field as a player. While at Derry, Hegarty was ever present on the sidelines as the club went on to win the FAI Cup, finish second in the League of Ireland and enjoyed an historic run in the UEFA Cup, being eliminated in the First Round by Paris St. Germain. On 15 December 2006 Hegarty announced that he would be moving on from his role as assistant manager at Derry due to difficulties in relation to Pat Fenlon's new training schedules for the 2007 season. With the managerial slot left empty at Finn Harps since Anthony Gorman's departure, Hegarty looked like the favourite to take the role at Finn Park. On 20 December 2006 Hegarty was named the new boss at Finn Harps after signing a two-year deal with the club.
Hegarty's touchline demeanour is well known to Irish football fans, and his high pitched shouted instructions can be heard on many a Friday night around Finn Park. Whilst in his first season he won promotion with Finn Harps he has presided over their immediate return to the First Division of the League of Ireland.

On 11 May 2009, Paul Hegarty left the club, stating "personal reasons" and was replaced as manager by James Gallagher.

On 6 January 2012 after an unsuccessful application for the managerial position at Derry City for himself, he joined the club as assistant to their new manager and preferred choice Declan Devine, both signing two year deals with the club. He took over as caretaker manager, after Peter Hutton left the club on 15 September 2015.

References

1967 births
Living people
People from Raphoe
Association footballers from County Donegal
Republic of Ireland association footballers
Derry City F.C. players
Finn Harps F.C. players
Coleraine F.C. players
Institute F.C. players
League of Ireland players
League of Ireland managers
NIFL Premiership players
Finn Harps F.C. managers
Institute F.C. managers
Association football midfielders
Republic of Ireland football managers